Belebey is an extinct genus of bolosaurid ankyramorph parareptile containing species known from the latest Carboniferous (Gzhelian) or earliest Permian (Asselian) to Guadalupian (Middle Permian) stage of Europe (Russia, France) and Asia (China, Qingtoushan Formation).

References

Procolophonomorphs
Permian reptiles of Asia
Permian reptiles of Europe
Prehistoric reptile genera